Hvalur 8 RE-388 is an Icelandic whaling ship built in 1948 in Norway. It has been a part of the Icelandic whaling fleet operated and owned by the company Hvalur hf. since 1962.

In 1973 she was requisitioned by the Icelandic Coast Guard, repainted and armed with a cannon and subsequently used as a patrol vessel during the Second Cod War dispute with the United Kingdom. Unlike its sister ship, Hvalur 9 which was renamed Týr, Hvalur 8 kept its name while in the ICG service. It was returned to its owner by June 1974.

Between 1987 and 2006, commercial whaling ceased in Iceland and the whaling ships remained unused at pier. After 20-years of inactivity, Hvalur 8 was brought back into action in June 2009. As of 2022, the ship remains active.

References

External links
Skipaskrá - The Icelandic ship registry

1948 ships
Ships built in Norway
Whaling ships
Ships of Iceland
Whaling in Iceland
Patrol vessels of Iceland